Reyhan Şeker (born May 22, 1984) is a Turkish retired women's football midfielder. She last played in the Turkish Women's First Football League for Ataşehir Belediyesi in Istanbul with jersey number 17. She is a member of the Turkey women's national football team since 2006.

Playing career

Club

By receiving her license on March 4, 2003, Reyhan Şeker began football playing at the club Gazi Üniversitesispor in Ankara, where she was born. She played in all the age teams of the club, and became finally part of the senior team in the 2008–09 season. In the 2009–10 season, her team finished the Women's First League as champion, and she was honored with the title Top Scorer for her 32 goals.

In the 2010–11 season, Şeker transferred to Ataşehir Belediyesi in Istanbul. In two successive seasons, 2010–11 and 2011–12, she enjoyed league championships with her club Ataşehir Belediyespor.

She debuted in the UEFA Women's Champions League playing in the  2011–12 qualifying round match with Ataşehir Belediyesi against Gintra Universitetas from Lithuania on August 11, 2011.

International
She made her first appearance in the national team taking part at the UEFA Women's Euro 2009 qualifying match against Northern Ireland on November 18, 2006.

Şeker was the scorer of two goals in the match, which the Turkey nationals defeated the Georgia women's national football team 9–0 at the UEFA Women's Euro 2009 qualifying round. At the UEFA Support International Tournament in 2007, she scored a goal against Azerbaijan.
Şeker netted a goal in the match against the Croatian women and two against the Latvians in the 2008 UEFA Support International Tournament played in Turkey. At the 4th UEFA Support International Tournament held 2009 in Georgia, she scored a goal against Georgia and two goals against Macedonia.

Career statistics
.

Honours

Club
 Turkish Women's First League Champion
 Gazi Üniversitesispor
 Winners (1): 2009–10

 Ataşehir Belediyespor
 Winners (2): 2010–11, 2011–12
 Runners-up (4): 2012–13, 2013–14, 2014–15, 2015–16
 Third places (1): 2016–17

Individual
 Top Scorer 2009–10 Women's First League (32 goals) with Gazi Üniversitesispor

References

External links

Living people
1984 births
Sportspeople from Ankara
Turkish women's footballers
Women's association football midfielders
Gazi Üniversitesispor players
Ataşehir Belediyespor players
Turkish Women's Football Super League players
Turkey women's international footballers
21st-century Turkish women